Ba Ge (4 July 1954 – 16 February 2022) was a Taiwanese actor and television host.

Career
Ba Ge began his career as a child actor. Following his graduation from National Taiwan University of Arts, he continued acting and became a television host for Chinese Television System. Ba Ge won two consecutive Golden Bell Awards for best variety show host in 1986 and 1987, was taken off the air in 1988, and won a third Golden Bell Award in 1991. He died at Linkou Chang Gung Memorial Hospital, where he was being treated for pancreatic cancer, on 16 February 2022, at the age of 67.

Filmography

Cinema
Orchids and My Love (1966)
The Sand Pebbles (1966)
 (1986)
 (1987)

Television
KO One (2005)
The X-Family (2007)
K.O.3an Guo (2010)
The World Between Us (2019)

References

1954 births
2022 deaths
Taiwanese male film actors
Taiwanese male television actors
Deaths from cancer in Taiwan
Deaths from pancreatic cancer
Taiwanese child actors
National Taiwan University of Arts alumni
21st-century Taiwanese male actors
20th-century Taiwanese male actors
Taiwanese television presenters